Levač is a historical region in central Serbia.  It is located between Juhor mountain on east and Gledićke planine on west.

The area is around 366 km2. Levač comprises 32 villages and one town called Rekovac:

 Bare
 Belušić
 Beočić
 Bogalinac
 Brajnovac
 Cikot
 Dulene
 Dobroselica
 Dragovo
 Kalenić
 Kaludra
 Kavadar
 Komarane
 Lepojević
 Loćika
 Lomnica
 Maleševo
 Motrić
 Nadrlje
 Oparić
 Prevešt
 Rabenovac
 Ratković
 Rekovac
 Sekurič
 Sibnica
 Siljevica
 Šljivica
 Tečić
 Ursule
 Vukmanovac
 Velika Kruševica
 Županjevac

External links 
 Levač-online

References

Historical regions in Serbia
Geography of Šumadija and Western Serbia
Šumadija